Alfa Romeo GTV refers to the following motor vehicle models:

 Alfa Romeo GT Veloce, Type 105/115 (1967-1976)
 Alfa Romeo GTV, Type 116 (1976-1987)
 Alfa Romeo GTV and Spider, Type 916 (1995-2005)